Achour Hasni (born 25 February 1972) is an Algerian handball player. He competed in the men's tournament at the 1996 Summer Olympics.

References

External links
 

1972 births
Living people
Algerian male handball players
Olympic handball players of Algeria
Handball players at the 1996 Summer Olympics
Place of birth missing (living people)
21st-century Algerian people